The Clănița is a left tributary of the river Teleorman in Romania. It discharges into the Teleorman in Măgura. The following villages are situated along the river Clănița, from source to mouth: Scurtu Mare, Talpa-Ogrăzile, Gălăteni, Clănița, Frăsinet, Băbăița and Guruieni.

References

Rivers of Romania
Rivers of Teleorman County
Rivers of Argeș County